USS Ingersoll (DD-990), a Spruance-class destroyer, was the second U.S. Navy ship to be named USS Ingersoll; in this case, in honor of Admiral Royal E. Ingersoll (1883–1976), who served as CINC, Atlantic Fleet during most of World War II.

Construction and career 
Ingersoll was laid down on 5 December 1977 by Ingalls Shipbuilding, Pascagoula, Miss.; launched on 10 March 1979; and commissioned on 12 April 1980.

Ingersoll was first homeported in San Diego, CA, then Long Beach, CA (for overhaul) and then Pearl Harbor.

Ingersoll was one of the first US Navy ships to receive the Armored Box Launcher version of the Tomahawk cruise missile system in 1985.  This early variant of the missile system held up to four missiles in each of two canisters located directly forward of the pilothouse on the fore deck.  However, this system proved to be very heavy and affected the ship's seakeeping.  The much more capable Vertical Launch missile system quickly made the Armored Box Launcher obsolete.

Collision
On 20 June 1992 while transiting the Straights of Malacca, Ingersoll collided with M/V Matsumi Maru No. 7, a Pakistani oil tanker. Flooding was minimal and Ingersoll was able to reach port in Singapore. After temporary repairs, Ingersoll returned to Pearl Harbor where it completed repairs and began overhaul.

Fate
Though Ingersoll was one of the newest ships of the Spruance class, it was one of the earliest to be decommissioned.  The cost to remove the Armored Box Launcher system and retrofit the Vertical Launching System likely contributed to the ship's early decommissioning. Ingersoll was decommissioned and stricken from the Navy Directory on 24 July 1998. She was sunk as a target on 29 July 2003.

Gallery

Awards
 Navy Unit Commendation – (Ocy 1997 – Apr 1998)
 Navy Meritorious Unit Commendation – (Nov 1984 – May 1985, May–Sep 1992)
 Southwest Asia Service Medal – (Apr–Jul 1991)
 Humanitarian Service Medal – (11 October 1981)

References

External links 

        navsource.org: USS Ingersoll
                 navysite.de: USS Ingersoll
 Ingersoll veterans website
 

Spruance-class destroyers
Cold War destroyers of the United States
Ships built in Pascagoula, Mississippi
1979 ships
Maritime incidents in 1992
Ships sunk as targets
Maritime incidents in 2003